Elvis Sings Hits from His Movies, Volume 1 is a compilation album by American singer and musician Elvis Presley, featuring tracks from four of his movies plus two non-movie tracks. The album was released in June 1972. It was certified Gold and Platinum on January 6, 2004 by the RIAA.

The collection reached no. 87 on the Billboard album chart.

Track listing

References
Elvis Sings Hits from His Movies, Volume 1 - Sergent.com.au

Elvis Presley compilation albums
1972 compilation albums
Soundtrack compilation albums
RCA Records compilation albums